Édouard Stern (18 October 1954 – 28 February 2005) was a French banker famously murdered in Geneva, Switzerland, by a woman he had a four-year relationship with. At the time of his death, he was the 38th richest French citizen.

Biography

Early life 
Édouard Stern was born in 1954 to one of France's wealthiest families, the owners of the private investment house Banque Stern. His father, Antoine Jean Stern is a descendant of a notable family of bankers, going back to 19th-century Frankfurt, and his mother was Christiane Laroche, former wife of French journalist and politician Jean-Jacques Servan-Schreiber.

Keen to follow in his father's footsteps, Stern graduated from the Ecole Supérieure des Sciences Economiques et Commerciales (ESSEC Business School) in Paris with a degree in finance before joining the family's private investment house in 1977.

Career 
Aged 22, Stern took the reins of Banque Stern with a clear mandate to revitalize the nearly bankrupt institution. During the 1980s, Stern revamped the bank, expanding its activity in financial markets, as well as in mergers and acquisitions. In 1985, Stern sold the bank for 300 million francs ($60 million in 2005 dollars) to Lebanese investors. Thanks to a clause attached to the contract, Stern got to keep the copyright over his last name. Immediately after the sale went through, Stern started a new bank, with a similar name and business profile, drawing in many of his former clients. He sold this second institution for an estimated 1.75 billion francs in 1988 to the Swiss Bank Corporation (SBS, which will later merge with UBS to form UBS S.A.). As a result of these transactions, Stern shot up the ranks of the richest families in France, occupying the 38th spot, according to Forbes.

In 1992, he joined Lazard Frères as managing partner and quickly became one of the firm's star bankers and heir-apparent. He tried to reduce overhead and bring in younger partners but clashed with Michel David-Weill, the bank's head and his father-in-law. He quit Lazard Frères in 1997 and set up his own investment fund, Investment Real Returns (IRR). He owned half and the remainder was held by Eurazeo, a Lazard holding company and Mainz Holdings Ltd., a U.S. Virgin Islands firm that Stern wholly owned. He maintained cordial relations with David-Weill, who invested $300 million in IRR.

In 2000, Stern bought shares in the London-based Delta PLC, an international engineering group that was revising its corporate strategy. His stake eventually increased to 26% and after applying considerable pressure, he was named non-executive chairman on 31 December 2003. In October 2003, Stern sued Rhodia, alleging false accounting and insider dealing. After Stern's death, Delta was taken over by the US company, Valmont.

During his almost three decade long career, Stern amassed a fortune of more than a $1 billion through a series of "often brilliant business deals". His banking style was considered revolutionary for France's so-called "cozy capitalism", as Stern honed his skill at engineering hostile takeovers.

Death 
On 28 February 2005, Stern was found dead in his apartment in Geneva, his body riddled with four bullets. He was found in the bedroom, in a flesh-coloured head-to-toe latex bodysuit and a dildo inserted in him.   Society columnist Taki Theodoracopulos has reported in The Spectator that Stern, in addition to having many girlfriends, was bisexual and had a boyfriend, and that he was a "rough trade" sex connoisseur.  Swiss authorities arrested his long-time lover, Cécile Brossard, who killed him during a sado-masochistic bondage session.  Brossard, 40, was convicted and on 18 June 2009 was sentenced to eight years and six months in prison. In addition, the Swiss court ordered Brossard to pay Stern's children one Swiss franc for "moral damage". The Wall Street Journal has reported that "Stern's family hopes people will stop talking about the case".

Cécile Brossard was freed on parole in November 2010, after spending five years in detention (including four years while awaiting trial. In 2013, Cécile Brossard talked about the murder for the first time since the trial, confessing that she "eternally regrets" her actions and she misses her lover, who had "a lovely and luminous personality".

The French film "Une Histoire d'Amour''. (titled in English 'Tied') is a direct telling of the story, although the ending there could imply death by dehydration during the mistress' long plane flight rather than by (a blank) gunshot.
The story of Édouard Stern is cited as the inspiration for Olivier Assayas' 2008 film Boarding Gate.
The death of Édouard Stern was directly parodied on the FX animated series Archer in the third season episode "Lo Scandalo".

Personal life 
In 1983, Édouard Stern married Béatrice David-Weill, the daughter of Michel David-Weill, president of Lazard Frères. The couple divorced in 1998. Stern is survived by three children: Mathilde, Louis, and Henri. In 1997, Stern became romantically linked to Julia Lemigova, former Miss USSR 1990.They had a child together, Maximillion, who he had later hired a “nanny” to kill. In 2000, Stern became involved with Cecile Brossard.

Stern was known for his eccentric life style. He was very close to former French President Nicolas Sarkozy. He was a notorious gourmand, once reportedly eating seventy pieces of sushi in one sitting.

References 

1954 births
2005 deaths
Businesspeople from Paris
ESSEC Business School alumni
French bankers
French Jews
French people murdered abroad
French murder victims
People murdered in Switzerland
2005 murders in Switzerland
Lazard family
Stern family (banking)